Real Talk is the fourth studio album by American singer Dave Hollister. It was released by DreamWorks Records on November 11, 2003 in the United States.

Critical reception

Allmusic editor Andy Kellman found that "this fourth album is only outshined by Ghetto Hymns as Hollister's best [...] It's a lean album with plenty of dimensions and little in the way of wasted moments. Hollister makes every second count, and while there might be a few lines that make you scratch your head – such as "I need you as bad as old folks need soft shoes" – Real Talk forges the singer's status as one of the most consistent, down-to-earth figures in contemporary R&B."

Track listing

Sample credits
 "The Big Payback" contains a sample of "The Big Payback", performed by James Brown.

Charts

References

2003 albums
Albums produced by Dave Hollister
Dave Hollister albums